Glush is a village in Gdovsky District of Pskov Oblast, Russia. Postal code: 181684.

References

Rural localities in Pskov Oblast